Neutrophilic dermatosis of the dorsal hands is a skin condition that presents with edematous pustular or ulcerative nodules or plaques localized to the dorsal hands.

See also 
 List of cutaneous conditions

References

 
Reactive neutrophilic cutaneous conditions